"Tender Heart" is a song by American singer Lionel Richie. It was written by Richie along with  Paul Barry and Billy Lawrie for his sixth studio album Renaissance (2001), while production was helmed by Brian Rawling and Mark Taylor. In the United Kingdom, the song was released as the album's third single in 2001 and reached number 29 on the UK Singles Chart.

Track listing

Notes
 signifies an additional producer

Credits and personnel 
Credits adapted from the album's liner notes.

Chris Anderson – assistant engineer
Paul Barry – acoustic guitar, writer
Paul Jackson Jr. – additional guitar
L.M.O. Studio Orchestra – strings
Billy Lawrie – writer
Adam Phillips – electric guitar
Brian Rawling – producer
Lionel Richie – fender rhodes, vocals, writer
Mark Taylor – arranger, mixing, producer, recording
Lionel Richie – vocals, writer
Robyn Smith – strings arranger
Dirk Vanoucek – additional recording
Jong uk Yoon – assistant engineer

Charts

References

2000 songs
2001 singles
Lionel Richie songs
Songs written by Lionel Richie